The Ksingmul (Vietnamese: Xinh Mul), also known as Con Pua, Puộc, and Pụa, are an ethnic group in Vietnam and Laos. In Vietnam, they live primarily in the northwest, in the provinces of Sơn La and Lai Châu. The group numbers approximately 29,503 people and its language is in the Khmuic languages group of the Mon–Khmer language family.

The Xinh Mun celebrate several festivals such as Muong A Ma, Ksaisatip, and Mạ Ma.

Subgroups
The Ksingmul are divided linguistically into three subgroups:
The Kháng of Vietnam
The Phong-Kniang of Laos
The Puoc of Vietnam and Laos.

Language
The Ksingmul speak the Ksingmul language, which is a Khmuic language. The Khmuic languages are Austro-Asiatic.

Geographic distribution
Population in Vietnam:  21,939
Population in Laos:  3,164

References

External links 
 RWAAI (Repository and Workspace for Austroasiatic Intangible Heritage)
 http://hdl.handle.net/10050/00-0000-0000-0003-9380-C@view Ksingmul in RWAAI Digital Archive

Ethnic groups in Laos
Ethnic groups in Vietnam
Khmuic peoples